Caterpillar Construction Tycoon is a business simulation game in which the player manages multiple construction sites. It was developed by Gabriel Entertainment, and published by Activision Value on September 15, 2005 for the PC. The object of this game, as in all tycoon computer games, is to become a tycoon, and in this case, a Construction Tycoon.

Gameplay
In this game, players must successfully manage different construction facilities around the world. In order to keep it running smoothly, they must draft Caterpillar Construction vehicles in addition to managing their employees time schedules and salaries.

References

2005 video games
Business simulation games
Caterpillar Inc.
Gabriel Entertainment games
Single-player video games
Video games developed in the United States
Windows games
Windows-only games